The Philadelphia Flyers are a professional ice hockey team based in Philadelphia, Pennsylvania. They are members of the Metropolitan Division of the National Hockey League's (NHL) Eastern Conference. The Flyers were founded in 1967 as one of six expansion teams, increasing the size of the NHL at that time to 12 teams.

Since the franchise was established, the team has won the Stanley Cup two times as league champions in 1974 and 1975, the Clarence S. Campbell Bowl six times – twice as division champions and four times as conference champions – and the Prince of Wales Trophy as conference champions four times.

Only Bobby Clarke and Eric Lindros have won regular season most valuable player honors as Flyers. Four Flyers players have won the Conn Smythe Trophy as the most valuable player of the playoffs, twice when the Flyers won the Stanley Cup – Bernie Parent in 1974 and 1975 – and twice when they lost in the finals – Reggie Leach in 1976 and Ron Hextall in 1987.

Nineteen people – thirteen players and six builders – who spent time with the Flyers have been inducted into the Hockey Hall of Fame. The Flyers have inducted twenty-seven people into a team hall of fame since 1988 and six of those inductees have also had their numbers retired.

League awards

Team trophies
The Flyers won the Stanley Cup as league champions in back-to-back years during the mid-1970s. They have not won the Cup since despite six return trips to the Stanley Cup Finals. They won the Clarence S. Campbell Bowl six times, twice as West Division champions and four times as Campbell Conference regular season champions. Realignment after the  season moved the Flyers to the Wales Conference (known as the Eastern Conference since the  season) and they have since won the trophy given to the conference's playoff champion, the Prince of Wales Trophy, four times. The Flyers have never won the Presidents' Trophy which has been given to the team finishing the regular season with the best overall record based on points since the  season. Prior to the creation of the trophy the Flyers led the league in points three times for the 1974–75, 1979–80, and 1984–85 seasons.

Individual awards
Twenty-one Flyers players or coaches have received thirty annual individual awards from the league, most occurring during the 1970s and 1980s. The most frequently won awards include the Bill Masterton Memorial Trophy, Conn Smythe Trophy, Hart Memorial Trophy, Jack Adams Award, and the Vezina Trophy, each won four times by Flyers players or coaches. Bobby Clarke's three Hart Trophy wins is the most of any Flyers player or coach of one particular award.

A few highly coveted NHL awards have never been won by Flyers players and occasionally they have been on the losing end of some close calls for them. Mark Howe finished as runner-up three times during the 1980s in voting for the James Norris Memorial Trophy, which is awarded to the defenseman who demonstrates throughout the season the greatest all-round ability in the position. During their respective rookie seasons, Bill Barber, Ron Hextall, and Shayne Gostisbehere finished second in voting for the Calder Memorial Trophy, given to the league's most outstanding rookie player. During the  season Eric Lindros finished tied for the league's scoring title with Pittsburgh Penguins forward Jaromir Jagr. However, Jagr was awarded the Art Ross Trophy, given to the league's regular season scoring champion, due to the first tiebreaker being the player with the most goals, Jagr having scored 32 goals compared to Lindros' 29.

In the case of the Lady Byng Memorial Trophy, awarded to the player who exhibits outstanding sportsmanship and gentlemanly conduct combined with a high standard of playing ability, no Flyers player has ever finished in the top three in the voting for it. Due to their history as the Broad Street Bullies during the 1970s it has been suggested the Lady Byng is not an award Flyers players covet. Dave Brown, who was an enforcer with the team during the 1980s and 1990s, went so far as to say the only way he would ever win the award is "if they renamed it the Man Byng."

All-Stars

NHL first and second team All-Stars

The NHL first and second team All-Stars are the top players at each position as voted on by the Professional Hockey Writers' Association.

NHL All-Rookie Team

The NHL All-Rookie Team consists of the top rookies at each position as voted on by the Professional Hockey Writers' Association.

All-Star Game selections
The National Hockey League All-Star Game is a mid-season exhibition game held annually between many of the top players of each season. Forty-five All-Star Games have been held since the Flyers entered the league in 1967, with at least one player chosen to represent the Flyers in each year. The All-Star game has not been held in various years: 1979 and 1987 due to the 1979 Challenge Cup and Rendez-vous '87 series between the NHL and the Soviet national team, respectively, 1995, 2005, and 2013 as a result of labor stoppages, 2006, 2010, and 2014 because of the Winter Olympic Games, and 2021 as a result of the COVID-19 pandemic. Philadelphia has hosted two All-Star Games. The 29th and 43rd took place at the Spectrum.

 Selected by fan vote
 Selected by Commissioner
 All-Star Game Most Valuable Player

All-Star Game replacement events
 Selected by fan vote

Career achievements

Hockey Hall of Fame
The following is a list of Philadelphia Flyers who have been enshrined in the Hockey Hall of Fame. Of the thirteen Flyers inducted as Players, six spent significant time with the team – Bobby Clarke and Bill Barber played their entire NHL careers with the Flyers while Bernie Parent, Mark Howe, Eric Lindros, and Mark Recchi each played at least eight seasons with the club. Of the six who were inducted as Builders who spent some time in the Flyers organization, Ed Snider, Keith Allen, and Fred Shero were inducted largely due to their time with the Flyers.

Foster Hewitt Memorial Award
Three members of the Flyers organization have been honored with the Foster Hewitt Memorial Award. The award is presented by the Hockey Hall of Fame to members of the radio and television industry who make outstanding contributions to their profession and the game of ice hockey during their broadcasting career.

Lester Patrick Trophy
Eight members of the Flyers organization have been honored with the Lester Patrick Trophy. The trophy has been presented by the National Hockey League and USA Hockey since 1966 to honor a recipient's contribution to ice hockey in the United States. This list includes all personnel who have ever been employed by the Philadelphia Flyers in any capacity and have also received the Lester Patrick Trophy.

United States Hockey Hall of Fame

Retired numbers

The Flyers have retired six of their jersey numbers and taken another number out of circulation. Barry Ashbee's number 4 was retired a few months after his death from leukemia. Bernie Parent's number 1 — Parent wore number 30 during his first stint with the Flyers — and Bobby Clarke's number 16 were retired less than a year after retiring while Bill Barber's number 7, Mark Howe's number 2, and Eric Lindros' number 88 were retired shortly after their inductions into the Hockey Hall of Fame. The number 31, last worn by goaltender Pelle Lindbergh, was removed from circulation after Lindbergh's death on November 11, 1985, but it is not officially retired. Also out of circulation is the number 99 which was retired league-wide for Wayne Gretzky on February 6, 2000. Gretzky did not play for the Flyers during his 20-year NHL career and no Flyers player had ever worn the number 99 prior to its retirement.

Flyers Hall of Fame

Established in 1988, the Flyers Hall of Fame was designed to "permanently honor those individuals who have contributed to the franchise's success." Candidates for the hall are nominated and voted upon by a panel of media members and team officials.

Team awards

Barry Ashbee Trophy

First awarded following the 1974–75 season, the Barry Ashbee Trophy is given out to the team's "outstanding defenseman"  as determined by a panel vote consisting of local sportscasters and sportswriters. The trophy is named in honor of Barry Ashbee, an NHL second team All-Star and the team's best defenseman during the 1973–74 season who suffered a career-ending eye injury during Game 4 of the 1974 Stanley Cup Semifinals. Eric Desjardins won the trophy seven times during his Flyers career including six in a row his first six seasons with the Flyers. Kimmo Timonen with five wins and Mark Howe with four wins are the only other Flyers to win the trophy at least four times.

|+ Winners of the Barry Ashbee Trophy

Bobby Clarke Trophy

The Flyers unveiled the Bobby Clarke Trophy on November 15, 1984, to honor the retired Bobby Clarke during Bobby Clarke Night at the Spectrum. Clarke was the captain of the Flyers for several seasons, including during the team's two Stanley Cup championship seasons, and was and still is the holder of several Philadelphia Flyers records. Since then it has been given to the "team's most valuable player" as determined by a panel vote consisting of local sportscasters and sportswriters. Claude Giroux won the trophy five times during his Flyers career while Eric Lindros won the trophy four times.

|+ Winners of the Bobby Clarke Trophy

Gene Hart Memorial Award
First given out for the 2006–07 season to honor the memory of long-time announcer Gene Hart, the Gene Hart Memorial Award is given to the Flyer "who demonstrated the most "Heart" during the season" as voted on by members of the Philadelphia Flyers Fan Club at their monthly meetings.

|+ Winners of the Gene Hart Memorial Award

Pelle Lindbergh Memorial Trophy

The Pelle Lindbergh Memorial Trophy is awarded to the "Flyer who has most improved from the previous season, as voted by his teammates." Named to honor the memory of Pelle Lindbergh, a Vezina Trophy–winning goaltender with the Flyers who died at the age of 26 on November 11, 1985, following a car crash the day before, the trophy has been given to 30 different players since the 1993–94 season.

|+ Winners of the Pelle Lindbergh Memorial Trophy

Toyota Cup
First given out following the 2000–01 season, the Toyota Cup is an award given to the player who earns the most points from Star of the game selections throughout the regular season, "five points for being the First Star, three for Second Star, and one for Third Star." The Tri-State Toyota Dealers sponsor the award and make a donation of $5,000 in the winning player's name to the player's favorite charity. Claude Giroux with seven wins, Simon Gagne with three wins, and Carter Hart with two wins are the only multiple-time winners of the trophy.

|+ Winners of the Toyota Cup

Yanick Dupre Memorial Class Guy Award

The Yanick Dupre Memorial Class Guy Award was first awarded following the 1976–77 season as the Class Guy Award "to the player who best exemplifies a strong rapport with the media." The award was renamed and re-defined in 1999 to honor the memory of Yanick Dupre. Dupre, who played 35 games over parts of three seasons with the Flyers, died on August 16, 1997, at the age of 24 after a 16-month battle with leukemia. It is now given to the "Flyer who best illustrates character, dignity and respect for the sport both on and off the ice" as decided by the Philadelphia chapter of the Professional Hockey Writers' Association.

|+ Winners of the Yanick Dupre Memorial Class Guy Award

Other awards and honors

John Wanamaker Athletic Award
The John Wanamaker Athletic Award is an award given to the "Athlete, team or organization which has done the most to reflect credit upon Philadelphia and to the team or sport in which they excel" by the Philadelphia Sports Congress. A Flyers player, coach, or team has won the award six times. In addition to the athletic award, Ed Snider won the lifetime achievement award in 2012 and the Flyers' Wives Fight for Lives won the community service award in 1996.

|+ Philadelphia Flyers who have received the John Wanamaker Athletic Award

Philadelphia Sports Hall of Fame

|+ Philadelphia Flyers inducted into the Philadelphia Sports Hall of Fame

Philadelphia Sports Writers Association
See: Philadelphia Sports Writers Association

See also
List of National Hockey League awards

Notes

References

Philadelphia Flyers
awards
History of the Philadelphia Flyers